Parabaena is a genus of flowering plants belonging to the family Menispermaceae.

Its native range is Tropical and Subtropical Asia.

Species
Species:

Parabaena denudata 
Parabaena echinocarpa 
Parabaena elmeri 
Parabaena megalocarpa 
Parabaena sagittata 
Parabaena tuberculata

References

Menispermaceae
Menispermaceae genera